Peter Clark Godber (born July 17, 1994) is a Canadian football offensive lineman for the Saskatchewan Roughriders of the Canadian Football League (CFL).

College career
Godber played college football for the Rice Owls from 2013 to 2017.

Professional career

BC Lions
At the 2018 CFL combine, Godber was asked to leave after declining to participate in events due to illness. Despite this, he was able to work out at Rice's pro day, where his results would have ranked in the short shuttle, three-cone and bench compared to other lineman if it were done at the combine.

On May 3, 2018, Godber was drafted by the BC Lions on May 3, 2018, with the third overall pick of the 2018 CFL Draft.  Godber officially signed with the Lions on May 20, 2018. He played in nine games in his rookie year in 2018 and made his first start on September 14, 2018, against the Montreal Alouettes. Godber suffered a season-ending leg injury on September 29, 2018, against the Hamilton Tiger-Cats, which led to him missing most of the 2019 season. He did not play in 2020 due to the cancellation of the 2020 CFL season.

In 2021, he started in all 14 regular season games for the team at centre. He became a free agent upon the expiry of his contract on February 14, 2023.

Saskatchewan Roughriders
On February 14, 2023, it was announced that Godber had signed with the Saskatchewan Roughriders.

References

External links
Rice Owls bio
Saskatchewan Roughriders bio

1994 births
BC Lions players
Canadian football offensive linemen
Canadian players of American football
Living people
Canadian football people from Toronto
Rice Owls football players
Saskatchewan Roughriders players